Cyclophyllum is a genus of flowering plants in the family Rubiaceae. It is found from New Guinea, Australia and on islands in many parts of the Pacific.

Species

 Cyclophyllum baladense Guillaumin
 Cyclophyllum balansae (Baill.) Guillaumin
 Cyclophyllum barbatum (G.Forst.) N.Hallé & J.Florence
 Cyclophyllum brevipes (Merr. & L.M.Perry) S.T.Reynolds & R.J.F.Hend.
 Cyclophyllum calyculatum Guillaumin
 Cyclophyllum cardiocarpum (Baill.) Guillaumin
 Cyclophyllum caudatum (Valeton) A.P.Davis & Ruhsam
 Cyclophyllum coprosmoides (F.Muell.) S.T.Reynolds & R.J.F.Hend.
 Cyclophyllum costatum (C.T.White) S.T.Reynolds & R.J.F.Hend.
 Cyclophyllum cymosum S.Moore
 Cyclophyllum deplanchei Hook.f.
 Cyclophyllum fragrans (Schltr. & K.Krause) Mouly
 Cyclophyllum francii Guillaumin
 Cyclophyllum guillauminianum Baum.-Bod. ex Mouly & Jeanson
 Cyclophyllum henriettiae (Baill.) Guillaumin
 Cyclophyllum jasminifolium Guillaumin & McKee
 Cyclophyllum letocartiorum Mouly
 Cyclophyllum longiflorum (Valeton) A.P.Davis & Ruhsam
 Cyclophyllum longipetalum S.T.Reynolds & R.J.F.Hend.
 Cyclophyllum lordbergense A.P.Davis
 Cyclophyllum macphersonii Mouly
 Cyclophyllum maritimum S.T.Reynolds & R.J.F.Hend.
 Cyclophyllum marquesense (F.Br.) Govaerts
 Cyclophyllum memaoyaense Mouly
 Cyclophyllum merrillianum Guillaumin
 Cyclophyllum multiflorum S.T.Reynolds & R.J.F.Hend.
 Cyclophyllum novoguineensis (Miq.) A.P.Davis
 Cyclophyllum pancheri (Baill.) Guillaumin
 Cyclophyllum pindaiense Mouly
 Cyclophyllum protractum S.T.Reynolds & R.J.F.Hend.
 Cyclophyllum rectinervium (A.C.Sm.) A.C.Sm. & S.P.Darwin
 Cyclophyllum rostellatum S.T.Reynolds & R.J.F.Hend.
 Cyclophyllum sagittatum (Baill.) Guillaumin
 Cyclophyllum saviense Guillaumin
 Cyclophyllum schultzii (O.Schwarz) S.T.Reynolds & R.J.F.Hend.
 Cyclophyllum sessilifolium (A.Gray) A.C.Sm. & S.P.Darwin
 Cyclophyllum subsessile (Valeton) A.P.Davis
 Cyclophyllum subulatum (Baill.) Guillaumin
 Cyclophyllum tenuipes Guillaumin
 Cyclophyllum tieaense Mouly
 Cyclophyllum tiebaghiense Mouly & Jeanson
 Cyclophyllum urophyllum (Valeton) A.P.Davis
 Cyclophyllum valetonianum (S.Moore) A.P.Davis
 Cyclophyllum vieillardii (Baill.) Guillaumin

References

External links 
 World Checklist of Rubiaceae

Rubiaceae genera
 
Taxa named by Joseph Dalton Hooker